Lee Han (born 1970) is a South Korean film director and screenwriter. He is best known for the coming-of-age film Punch, which became one of the biggest hits on the South Korean box office in 2011.

Career
Lee Han graduated from Hanyang University's theater and film program. He first worked as an assistant director on two films for veteran filmmaker Bae Chang-ho: Love Story (1996) and My Heart (1999). In 2002, he wrote and directed his first feature, Lovers' Concerto, a melodrama about three friends caught in a love triangle which starred Cha Tae-hyun, Lee Eun-ju and Son Ye-jin. He then wrote the screenplay for Garden of Heaven (2003), a tearjerker about a hospice doctor who falls for a terminally ill patient, played by Ahn Jae-wook and Lee Eun-joo. Lee was also part of the writing staff of Bodyguard, a 2003 action-comedy television series starring Cha Seung-won.

With his succeeding films, Lee further solidified his reputation as a filmmaker with a keen insight into modern romance. Almost Love (also known as Youth Comic) is a 2006 romantic comedy starring Kwon Sang-woo and Kim Ha-neul about a stuntman and an actress with stage fright. My Love (also known as Love, First) is a 2007 Christmas movie which featured an ensemble cast playing multiple couples, namely Kam Woo-sung, Choi Kang-hee, Ryu Seung-ryong, Im Jung-eun, Jung Il-woo, Lee Yeon-hee and Uhm Tae-woong.

But Lee's breakthrough film would be his fourth feature, Punch (2011). Based on Kim Ryeo-ryeong's 2008 bestseller Wandeuk, the film seriously highlighted the issue of multicultural families in a coming-of-age comedy-drama about a poor and rebellious teenage boy (the titular Wandeuk, played by Yoo Ah-in), whose idiosyncratic homeroom teacher and next-door neighbor (Kim Yoon-seok) encourages him to learn more about his Filipino immigrant mother, and their teacher-student relationship helps him mature into a young man. After gaining strong word of mouth for its interesting story and charismatic performances, Punch became a surprise box office hit, drawing 5.3 million viewers. It was also invited to the 2012 Berlin International Film Festival; it screened in Generation 14Plus, a competition section of Berlinale devoted to films for teens. Commenting on the film's positive reception, Lee told Yonhap News that the seemingly eclectic ensemble of characters who appear in Punch, though they rarely receive the limelight, are present and active as members of Korean society. He also believed that the warmth and honesty with which he tried to portray these characters and introduce their daily lives was what resonated with viewers.

In 2014, Lee adapted another bestselling novel by Kim Ryeo-ryeong, Elegant Lies (published in 2009). When quizzed about adapting another work by the same author, Lee said that he chose to do so because "the story was interesting as well as meaningful. In fact I turned down the original story at first because it seemed too difficult. However, it captivated and wouldn't let go. I finally made up my mind to deliver this story to show people who thought it couldn't be done. This film was made for the readers who think this family's story is as special as I do." Thread of Lies explores the aftermath of a 14-year-old girl's suicide, as her mother and older sister belatedly learn after her death that she had been an outcast in middle school and a victim of bullying. Kim Hee-ae played the mother, in her first film in 21 years after focusing on television work, opposite a teenage cast composed of Go Ah-sung, Kim Yoo-jung and Kim Hyang-gi.

Filmography
Innocent Witness (2019) - director, screenwriter
Thread of Lies (2013) - director
Punch (2011) - director, script editor
My Love (2007) - director, script editor
Almost Love (2006) - director, screenplay
Bodyguard (TV, 2003) - screenplay
Garden of Heaven (2003) - screenplay
Lovers' Concerto (2002) - director, screenplay
My Heart (2000) - assistant director
Love Story (1996) - assistant director, costume designer

Awards
2012 21st Buil Film Awards: Best Director (Punch)

References

External links

1970 births
South Korean film directors
South Korean screenwriters
Living people